Shalom Aleichem ('Peace be upon you') is a traditional song sung by many Jews every Friday night upon returning home from synagogue prayer. It signals the arrival of the Shabbat, welcoming the angels who accompany a person home on the eve of the Shabbat. The custom of singing "Shalom Aleichem" on Friday night before Eshet Ḥayil and Kiddush is now nearly universal among religious Jews.

Sources
This liturgical poem was written by the kabbalists of Safed in the late 16th or early 17th century. A complete survey of extant manuscripts, compiled by Chaim Leiberman, is available in Kirjath Sepher vol. 38–9.

According to a homiletic teaching in the Talmud, two angels accompany people on their way back home from synagogue on Friday night—a good angel and an evil angel. If the house has been prepared for the Shabbat ("the lamp has been lit, the table set, and his couch spread"), the good angel utters a blessing that the next Shabbat will be the same, and the evil angel is forced to respond "Amen", but if the home is not prepared for Shabbat, the evil angel expresses the wish that the next Shabbat will be the same, and the good angel is forced to respond "Amen". The hymn is assumed to be based on this teaching.

Words

Variations and emendations 
Mizrahi and some Sephardi traditions include a penultimate verse, beginning , "In your rest for peace ..." and the final verse has a {בְּ} inserted in front of the צ  which Koren claims does not change the meaning of the last verse. This {בְּ} is also present in Tikunei Shabbos, the earliest known printing of the poem; as is one before the {ב} of the second verse.

Elijah of Vilna (1720–1789) worried about the phrasing and warned singers to be careful not to pause between elyon, Most High, and mee-melech, from the king.

Moshe Yair Weinstock, among others, criticizes the final verse for rudely urging the angels on.

Yaakov Chaim Sofer, in his work Kaf Hachayim, (262:16) notes:

This position resolves a common complaint about the wording—namely, that it sounds like the speaker is shooing the angels away—and somewhat neatens the grammar, especially of the Sephardic tradition. The resultant text translates:

Rabbi Jacob Emden, in his prayerbook, Bet El (1745), criticized the use of the hymn on the grounds that supplications on the Sabbath and supplications to angels were inappropriate and the hymn's grammar—arguing that the inclusion of the prefix מִ at the beginning of every second line (i.e., mee-melech) was bad form, as it rendered the passage, "angels of the Most High, away from the King who rules over kings". He, therefore, deleted that מִ, thereby reducing mi-melech to melech, and that deletion has been emulated in some other prayerbooks (apparently a small minority) such as Seligman Baer's Siddur Avodat Yisroel (1868), the Orot Sephardic, and Koren's Mizrahi (but not Koren's Ashkenaz or Sefard) prayerbook, although it makes the musical meter a bit awkward.

Melodies
Many different melodies have been written for Shalom Aleichem.

The slow, well-known melody for the song was composed by the American composer and conductor Rabbi Israel Goldfarb on May 10, 1918, while sitting near the Alma Mater statue in front of Low Memorial Library at Columbia University, and first published later that year as "Sholom Aleichem—שָׁלוֹם עֲלֵיכֶם" in Friday Evening Melodies by Israel and his brother Samuel. The famous Goldfarb song is often presumed to be a traditional Hasidic melody. I. Goldfarb wrote in 1963, "The popularity of the melody traveled not only throughout this country but throughout the world, so that many people came to believe that the song was handed down from Mt. Sinai by Moses." In the Preface to "Friday Evening Melodies" the composers articulated the goal of avoiding the extremes of both the free-form emotive Eastern European musical liturgical style and the classical Western European musical structure of "Israel Emancipated".

A modern, exuberantly joyful version of this melody has been popularized by Idan Yaniv and Kinderlach; it was released in September 2009.

As one of her last acts, Debbie Friedman shared her version of "Shalom Aleichem" with Rabbi Joy Levitt. Friedman believed it was this song that would become her legacy.

Another common melody, with a faster, more upbeat tempo was composed by Rabbi Shmuel Brazil.

References

External links
Recordings of four tunes to Shalom Aleichem
Shalom Aleichem lyrics and MIDI tune from www.ingeb.org
Shalom Aleichem full song with vocalization and (transliterated) lyrics
Commentaries on the Shalom Aleichem Liturgy

Hebrew-language literature
Jewish practices
Jewish belief and doctrine
Jewish liturgical poems
Jewish mysticism
Jewish prayer and ritual texts
Shabbat
Hebrew words and phrases in Jewish prayers and blessings
Zemirot